Diao Yinan (born 1969 in Xi'an, Shaanxi) is a Chinese director, screenwriter and occasional actor. He won the Golden Bear for Best Film at the 2014 Berlin International Film Festival for the widely acclaimed Chinese neo-noir film Black Coal, Thin Ice. Diao is considered a member of the sixth generation of Chinese film makers whose subject matter is focused on realism and stories of urban crime.

Biography
A graduate of the Central Academy of Drama in 1992, Diao has worked as a screenwriter with directors Shi Runjiu (in All the Way) and Zhang Yang (in Spicy Love Soup and Shower). Additionally, Diao has directed four films of his own, including  2003's Uniform and 2007's Night Train, which premiered in the Un Certain Regard competition at the Cannes Film Festival. Diao is a well known producer of neo noir films.

Diao most recently directed Wild Goose Lake (2019), which received its world premiere at Cannes. Wild Goose Lake tells the story of an ostracized gangster and a woman on the run, drawing on actual events (such as the “congress of the thieves,” a summit of criminals that took place in Wuhan in 2012) and screened at the 57th New York Film Festival.

Filmography

As screenwriter

As director

As actor

References

External links
 
 
 Diao Yinan at the Chinese Movie Database
 Short biography from the Global Film Initiative

Film directors from Shaanxi
Screenwriters from Shaanxi
Male actors from Shaanxi
1969 births
Living people
Central Academy of Drama alumni
Writers from Xi'an
Artists from Xi'an
Male actors from Xi'an
Chinese male film actors
Chinese film directors
Directors of Golden Bear winners